A Handful of Beauty is the second studio album released by the world fusion band Shakti in 1976.

Track listing
 "La Danse du Bonheur" (John McLaughlin, Lakshminarayana Shankar) – 4:48
 "Lady L" (Shankar) – 7:23
 "India" (McLaughlin, Shankar) – 12:31
 "Kriti" – 2:58
 "Isis" (McLaughlin, Shankar) – 15:11
 "Two Sisters" (McLaughlin) – 4:41

Personnel

Musicians
Zakir Hussain – percussion, tabla
John McLaughlin – acoustic guitar, guitar, arranger, producer
Lakshminarayana Shankar – violin, arranger, vocals
Vikku Vinayakram – percussion, vocals

Technical
Dennis MacKay – engineer
Steven Berkowitz – assistant
Stephen W Tayler – assistant
Richard Laird – photography

Chart performance

References 

Shakti (band) albums
1976 albums
Columbia Records albums